Faruqui is a surname. Notable people with the surname include:

 Ahmad Faruqui (born 1953), Pakistani defense analyst and economist
 Mohammad Naseem Faruqui (died 2012), Indian academic administrator
 Munawar Faruqui (born 1992), Indian stand-up comedian
 Naseer Ahmad Faruqui (1906–1991), Pakistani civil servant
 Sharmila Faruqui (born 1978), Pakistani politician

See also
 Farooqui